Thomas O. Mensah (born around 1950) is a Ghanaian-American chemical engineer and inventor who contributed to the development of fiber optic manufacturing and nanotechnology. He has 14 patents, and was inducted into the US National Academy of Inventors in 2015. In 2017, Dr. Mensah served as Editor-in-Chief of the textbook Nanotechnology Commercialization, published by John Wiley & Sons.

Early life and education

Thomas Mensah was born in Kumasi, Ghana. His father, J.K. Mensah, was a merchant who shipped cocoa products to chocolate manufacturers in France. Mensah was fluent in French, and won the National French competition in Ghana, both at the Ordinary Levels (1968) and Advanced Levels (1970) in Accra Ghana.

Mensah attended Adisadel College in Cape Coast Ghana and completed his undergraduate studies in chemical engineering at the Kwame Nkrumah University of Science and Technology. He then received a French government fellowship to study at Montpellier University in France. While there, he took part in a program at the Massachusetts Institute of Technology (MIT) and received a certificate in Modeling and Simulation of Chemical Processes from MIT in 1977. A year later, he graduated with his PhD in Chemical Engineering from Montpelier University.

Career 
Mensah worked at Air Products and Chemicals from 1980 to 1983.

In 1983, Mensah joined Corning Glass Works, working in fiber optics research at Sullivan Park, New York. Researchers at Corning had previously developed optical fiber with loss below the crucial attenuation limit of 20 dB/km, but the fibers could not be manufactured at rates higher than 2 meters per second. Mensah improved the manufacturing process through a series of innovations, raising the speed of manufacture to 20 meters per second by 1985. This made the cost of optical fiber comparable to traditional copper cables. Mensah received the Corning Glass Works Individual Outstanding Contributor Award for this work in 1985. His work ultimately raised speed of manufacture above 50 m/s. 
 
Mensah moved to Bell laboratories in 1986, where he led a program to develop the first laser-guided weapons for the US Department of Defense guided missile program. This program enabled the development of missiles that travel at the speed of sound (Mach 1).

Mensah is president and CEO of Georgia Aerospace Systems, which manufactures nanocomposite structures used in missiles and aircraft for the US Department of Defense. On February 24, 2017, CBS Television News ran a segment for Black History Month featuring Dr. Mensah titled "The Engineer who Revolutionized the Internet."

Mensah also serves on the board of several organizations, including the AIChE National Board of Directors (1987–1990), and is a current Trustee of the Board of AIChE Foundation and a board member for the NASA Space Grant Consortium at Georgia Institute of Technology. Mensah was elected a Fellow US National Academy of Inventors in 2014. 
 
He is chairman of Entertainment Arts Research Inc, a Virtual Reality and Video Game Design Company.

Since early 2016, Mensah has been working to create a "Silicon Valley of the South" in the US State of Texas.

Awards 
Mensah is a recipient of several awards, including Turner's Trumpet Award for Fiber Optics Innovation, the Percy Julian Award, the Golden Torch Award, the highest award by NSBE, William Grimes Award, and the Eminent Engineers award by AIChE. He is also a member of the AIChE 100. In December 2017 he received the Kwame Nkrumah African Genius Award in Science/Technology and Innovation in Ghana.
Mensah delivered the 10th R. P. Baffour Lecture at the Kwame Nkrumah University of Science and Technology on November 23, 2017, where he was awarded an honorary Doctor of Science degree after the lecture. In November 2015, he received the International Business Leadership Award from the African Leadership Magazine in Atlanta Georgia, USA. He has been profiled in Ebony Magazine's edition of October 2006 and Chemical Engineering Progress Magazine's edition of October 2008, March 2009 and March 2015. He served on the visiting committee in Chemical Engineering at the Massachusetts Institute of Technology from 1988 to 1992. He has also published four books: Fiber Optics Engineering in 1987, Superconductor Engineering in 1992, his autobiography The Right Stuff Comes in Black, Too in 2013, and Nanotechnology Commercialization in 2017. In the first quarter of 2015, the government of the State of Georgia in the USA passed a House Resolution to commend Mensah and his works.

References

External links 
Official website

Ghanaian chemical engineers
Fiber optics
20th-century American inventors
African-American inventors
American scientists
African-American scientists
Scientists at Bell Labs
People from Kumasi
Ghanaian emigrants to the United States
Kwame Nkrumah University of Science and Technology alumni
University of Montpellier alumni
Members of the United States National Academy of Engineering
Fellows of the American Institute of Chemical Engineers
Fellows of the American Institute of Aeronautics and Astronautics
Living people
Year of birth uncertain
21st-century African-American people
Ghanaian engineers
Year of birth missing (living people)